David Furlonge (born 15 June 1958) is a Trinidadian cricketer. He played in thirteen first-class and five List A matches for Trinidad and Tobago from 1977 to 1985.

See also
 List of Trinidadian representative cricketers

References

External links
 

1958 births
Living people
Trinidad and Tobago cricketers